is a Japanese voice actor. He is known for his roles in the anime series, many of which feature Rie Kugimiya, such as Shakugan no Shana, Zero no Tsukaima, Gintama and Nabari no Ou.

Personal life 
Hino lived in San Francisco until the age of five. He moved to Tokyo. 

In January 2015, he announced on his blog that he married Saki Nakajima in 2014. On September 3, 2020, Both Hino and Nakajima formally announced that not only are they parents, but also tweeted the arrival of their second child. He is a first dan in kendo.

Career
He was a member of the Children's Theater Company when he was a teenager. Hino originally aimed to be a stage actor, but changed goals to become a voice actor in earnest following his participation in the dubbing of the American drama television series ER. In 2001, he played his first lead role as Eddie in the overseas drama Wanda Eddy broadcast on NHK Educational TV.

While initially not aware of dubbing's connection to anime, he was called to the audition for, and eventually secured a role in, Ikki Tousen, a work in which the dubbing director participated. Hino has performed as a voice actor in various fields such as dubbing, animation, games and narration. Until June 2011, he was affiliated with Production Baobab. Since July 2011, Hino has been affiliated with Axl-One.

Filmography

Anime series
2003
Ikki Tousen, Kokin Shuyu
Nitaboh, Nitaro/Nitaboh

2004
Meine Liebe, Anri
Yakitate!! Japan, Masanobu Tsutsumi
Yu-Gi-Oh! Duel Monsters GX, Kagurazaka

2005
Shakugan no Shana, Yūji Sakai
Trinity Blood, Abel (young)
Da Capo: Second Season, Furuta

2006Asatte no Hōkō, Hiro IokawaHell Girl: Two Mirrors, Seiichi MeshiaiProject Sylpheed, Katana FarawayThe Familiar of Zero, Saito HiragaREBORN!, ArachideNaruto, Akio

2007Hayate the Combat Butler, Kyonosuke KaoruKimikiss Pure Rouge, Kōichi SanadaNaruto Shippuden 2007-2017, Sai, ShibaShakugan no Shana II, Yūji SakaiThe Familiar of Zero: Knight of the Twin Moons, Saito Hiraga

2008Cross Edge, Yūto KannagiNabari no Ou, Kōichi AizawaNodame Cantabile: Paris, Li YunlongThe Familiar of Zero: Rondo of Princesses, Saito HiragaBlack Butler, Ash Landers

2009First Love Limited, Yoshihiko BesshoGintama, KamuiMetal Fight Beyblade, Kyoya TategamiTaishō Baseball Girls, Saburou KitaniTayutama: Kiss on my Deity, Yuuri MitoLa Corda d'Oro: Secondo Passo, Kiriya Eto

2010Hanamaru Kindergarten, Naozumi TsuchidaBakuman, Akito TakagiCat Shit One, BotaskyThe Legend of the Legendary Heroes, Luke StokkartOtome Yōkai Zakuro, Riken YoshinokazuraA Certain Magical Index II, Shiage HamazuraThe Betrayal Knows My Name, Senshiro FuruoriMazinkaizer SKL, Ryo MagamiHighschool of the Dead, Tsunoda
Metal Fight Beyblade Baku, Kyoya Tategami

2011Bakuman 2, Akito TakagiMayo Chiki!, Kinjirō Sakamachi
Metal Fight Beyblade 4D, Kyoya TategamiGintama, KamuiSket Dance, Akitoshi DaimonShakugan no Shana III Final, Yūji SakaiWorking'!!, Kirio Yamada

2012Accel World, Rust JigsawThe Familiar of Zero F, Saito HiragaHagure Yuusha no Estetica, Ryouhei UesakiRock Lee & His Ninja Pals, SaiBakuman 3, Akito TakagiCode Geass: Akito the Exiled, Ryou SayamaThe Pet Girl of Sakurasou, Sōichirō TatebayashiDramatical Murder, Noiz

2013Aikatsu!, KingAmnesia, TomaCuticle Detective Inaba, Hamada IyoriHakkenden: Eight Dogs of the East, Sosuke Inukawa/AoGifuu Doudou!! Kanetsugu to Keiji, Miyoshi NagayoshiHayate the Combat Butler! Cuties, Kyounosuke KaoruYu-Gi-Oh! Zexal, Rei Shingetsu/VectorMagi: The Labyrinth of Magic, Koumei RenLog Horizon, IssacYowamushi Pedal, Hayato Shinkai

2014Haikyu!!, Daichi SawamuraRail Wars!, Shō IwaizumiLa Corda d'Oro: Blue Sky, Leiji Myoga, Kiriya EtoDramatical Murder, NoizNaruto Shippuden, ByakurenFuture Card Buddyfight, Kyoya GaenGugure! Kokkuri-san, Kureha's LoverFrancesca, Yoshitsune MinamotoInari Kon Kon, ShishiYowamushi Pedal Grande Road, Hayato ShinkaiAkame ga Kill!, IbaraAmagi Brilliant Park, DornelMonthly Girls' Nozaki-kun, Tomoda

2015Plastic Memories, ConstanceSamurai Warriors, Ōtani YoshitsuguOverlord, Momonga/Ainz Ooal GownMy Teen Romantic Comedy SNAFU, TamanawaGo! Princess PreCure, ShutAbsolute Duo, ClovisOne-Punch Man, Superalloy BlacklusterLovely Muco, Komatsu-sanGintama, KamuiWorking!!!, Kirio YamadaHaikyu!! 2, Daichi Sawamura

2016Haikyū!! 3, Daichi SawamuraThe Disastrous Life of Saiki K., Kineshi HairoYuri!!! on Ice, Emil NekolaThe Heroic Legend of Arslan: Dust Storm Dance, Merlane

2017ACCA: 13-Territory Inspection Dept., WarblerAtom: The Beginning, Reckless TakeshiBoruto: Naruto Next Generations, SaiClassroom of the Elite, Kouhei KatsuragiThe Ancient Magus' Bride, Mikhail RenfredGintama., KamuiChain Chronicle: The Light of Haecceitas, RafalgarTales of Zestiria the X Season 2, MichaelA Sister's All You Need, Haruto FuwaKing's Game, Takuya SakamotoYowamushi Pedal: New Generation, Hayato Shinkai

2018Black Clover, Gauche AdlaiRecord of Grancrest War, Lassic DavidOverlord II, Ainz Ooal GownOverlord III, Ainz Ooal Gown The Disastrous Life of Saiki K. 2, Kineshi HairoDevils' Line, Ryusei YanagiCells at Work!, Teacher NeutrophilKakuriyo: Bed and Breakfast for Spirits, Raijū100 Sleeping Princes and the Kingdom of Dreams, GaryKitsune no Koe, Ji HetianA Certain Magical Index III, Shiage HamazuraGintama.: Shirogane no Tamashii-hen 2, KamuiBack Street Girls: Gokudolls, Ryuu TachibanaHigh School DxD Hero, 	Rudiger RosenkreutzSchool Babysitters, Kosuke MamizukaYowamushi Pedal: Glory Line, Hayato ShinkaiUlysses: Jeanne d'Arc and the Alchemist Knight, Henry VFree! Dive to the Future, Nao SerizawaRun with the Wind, Kazuma FujiokaLord of Vermilion: The Crimson King, Dōmyōji Kotetsu As Miss Beelzebub Likes, Azazel

2019The Quintessential Quintuplets, Isanari UesugiIsekai Quartet, Ainz Ooal GownOne-Punch Man 2, Superalloy BlacklusterFire Force, Foien LiKochoki: Wakaki Nobunaga, Tsuzuki KurandoHigh Score Girl II, MasaruIsekai Cheat Magician, InimeexDidn't I Say to Make My Abilities Average in the Next Life?!, ElbertVinland Saga, WillibaldDemon Slayer: Kimetsu no Yaiba, Kyōjurō RengokuAscendance of a Bookworm, Otto

2020A Certain Scientific Railgun T, Shiage HamazuraInfinite Dendrogram, Shu StarlingIsekai Quartet 2, Ainz Ooal GownHaikyū!! 4, Daichi SawamuraPlunderer, Taketora DouanAscendance of a Bookworm: Part II, OttoKomatta Jii-san, Old ManTomica Kizuna Gattai: Earth Granner, Gao Granner EagleMoriarty the Patriot, Sebastian MoranMy Teen Romantic Comedy SNAFU Fin, TamanawaJujutsu Kaisen, Noritoshi Kamo

2021Suppose a Kid from the Last Dungeon Boonies Moved to a Starter Town, MerthophanSkate-Leading Stars, Shotaro TerauchiThat Time I Got Reincarnated as a Slime Season 2, GruciusLog Horizon: Destruction of the Round Table, IssacFull Dive, TeslaTokyo Revengers, Masataka "Kiyomasa" KiyomizuThe Aquatope on White Sand, Tetsuji SuwaMuteking the Dancing Hero, SeoIrina: The Vampire Cosmonaut, Mikhail YashinThe Fruit of Evolution, Xelos, the Noble of the DarknessBuild Divide -#00000 (Code Black)-, LoinelTakt Op. Destiny, Lenny

2022Orient, Naotora TakedaRequiem of the Rose King, William CatesbyThe Strongest Sage with the Weakest Crest, AyriasWorld's End Harem, Ryuu MizuharaLife with an Ordinary Guy Who Reincarnated into a Total Fantasy Knockout, Tsukasa JinguujiAscendance of a Bookworm: Part III, OttoClassroom of the Elite 2nd Season, Kouhei KatsuragiOverlord IV, Ainz Ooal GownNights with a Cat, FuutaBleach: Thousand-Year Blood War, Lille Barro

2023Campfire Cooking in Another World with My Absurd Skill, FelThe Ancient Magus' Bride 2nd Season, Mikhail RenfredClassroom of the Elite 3rd Season, Kouhei KatsuragiSacrificial Princess and the King of Beasts, Leonhart

Original net animationAkame ga Kill! Theater (2014), IbaraKare Baka (2015), Peruhiko SaijōThe Disastrous Life of Saiki K.: Reawakened (2019), Kineshi HairoPowerful Pro Yakyū Powerful Kōkō-hen (2021), Yūto SaigaThe Way of the Househusband (2021), Miku's FatherJoJo's Bizarre Adventure: Stone Ocean (2021), Johngalli A.Thermae Romae Novae (2022), Regulus

Original video animationAir Gear (2010), Black BurnRe:Zero – Starting Life in Another World: Hyōketsu no Kizuna (2019), ChapArifureta: From Commonplace to World's Strongest (2022), Naiz Gruen

SpecialAmagi Brilliant Park: Nonbirishiteiru Hima ga Nai! (2015), DornelWorking!!!: Lord of the Takanashi (2016), Kirio YamadaThe Disastrous Life of Saiki K. Final Arc (2018), Kineshi Hairo

Television dramaThe Way of the Househusband (2020), Narrator (ep. 2)

Anime filmsNaruto Shippuden 2: Bonds, Sai (2008)Naruto Shippuden 3: Inheritors of the Will of Fire, Sai (2009)Naruto Shippuden 4: The Lost Tower, Sai (2010)Naruto the Movie: Blood Prison, Sai (2011)Road to Ninja: Naruto the Movie, Sai (2012)The Last: Naruto the Movie, Sai (2014)Boruto: Naruto the Movie, Sai (2015)Yu-Gi-Oh!: The Dark Side of Dimensions, Mani (2016)Free! -Take Your Marks-, Nao Serizawa (2017)Free! Road to the World - the Dream, Nao Serizawa (2019)Demon Slayer: Kimetsu no Yaiba the Movie: Infinity Train, Kyōjurō Rengoku (2020)Pretty Guardian Sailor Moon Eternal: The Movie -Part 1-, Tiger's Eye (2021)Sing a Bit of Harmony (2021), ThunderThe Quintessential Quintuplets Movie (2022), Isanari Uesugi

Tokusatsu
2016Doubutsu Sentai Zyuohger, Mantor (ep. 16)
2018Kaitou Sentai Lupinranger VS Keisatsu Sentai Patranger, Jenko Copamino (ep. 12)Hero Mama League, Space Ninja DemostUchu Sentai Kyuranger vs. Space Squad, Space Ninja Demost
2019Ultraman Taiga - Ultraman Titas (eps. 1, 3 - )

Video gamesNaruto (series), SaiLeague of Legends, EzrealLittle Anchor, Fennel YorkSeveral Shades of Sadism (SSS), Chiaki KiraHigurashi: When They Cry (2008), Akira TodouYu-Gi-Oh! ZEXAL World Duel Carnival (2013), VectorDRAMAtical Murder re:code (2014), NoizTales of Zestiria (2014), MichaelYakuza Kiwami (2016), TakashiSamurai Warriors: Spirit of Sanada (2016), Yoshitsugi OtaniYakuza Kiwami 2 (2017), TakashiFate/Grand Order (2018), Napoleon BonaparteA3! Act! Addict! Actors! (2018), GuyFood Fantasy (2018) – Peking Duck, Sanma, SteakWarriors Orochi 4 (2018), Yoshitsugi OtaniDragalia Lost (2018), WaikePromise of wizard (2019), BradleyPersona 5 The Royal  (2019), Maruki TakutoHonkai Impact 3rd (2019), Kevin KaslanaArknights (2020), HungBleach: Brave Souls (2020), Lille BarroBravely Default 2 (2021), Prince CastorTokyo Afterschool Summoners (2021), TindalosAlchemy Stars (2021), Seleucid and Chainsaw Rick

Dubbing
Live-action
Ju Ji-hoonPrincess Hours, Crown Prince Lee ShinFive Fingers, Yoo Ji-hoAlong with the Gods: The Two Worlds, HaewonmakAlong with the Gods: The Last 49 Days, Dark Figure of Crime, Kang Tae-ohThe Adventurers, Po Chen (Tony Yang)Arrow, Oliver Queen / Arrow (Stephen Amell)Awake, Sheriff Roger Bower (William Forsythe)Breaking and Entering, Mirsad "Miro" Simić (Rafi Gavron)Burying the Ex, Max (Anton Yelchin)Captain Marvel, Att-Lass (Algenis Perez Soto)Christine (2019 Blu-Ray edition), Dennis Guilder (John Stockwell)Crash Landing on You, Ri Jeong-hyeok (Hyun Bin)Crisis on Earth-X, Oliver Queen / Arrow (Stephen Amell)The Day After Tomorrow, Brian Parks (Arjay Smith)A Discovery of Witches, Matthew Clairmont (Matthew Goode)Eragon, Roran (Christopher Egan)Good People, Tom Wright (James Franco)Good Sam, Dr. Caleb Tucker (Michael Stahl-David)Harry Potter and the Goblet of Fire, Cedric Diggory (Robert Pattinson)Helix, Dr. Kyle Sommer (Matt Long)Jappeloup (2021 BS TV Tokyo edition), Pierre Durand, Jr. (Guillaume Canet)Jurassic World Dominion, Ramsay Cole (Mamoudou Athie)Just like Heaven, Darryl (Jon Heder)The Legend of 1900 (2020 Blu-Ray edition), 1900 (Tim Roth)Napoleon Dynamite, Pedro Sánchez (Efren Ramirez)Pawn Shop Chronicles, Raw Dog (Paul Walker)Resident Evil: Welcome to Raccoon City, Albert Wesker (Tom Hopper)A Royal Night Out, Jack Hodges (Jack Reynor)Simple Simon, Simon (Bill Skarsgård)The Suicide Squad, Javelin (Flula Borg)Superbad, Evan (Michael Cera)Tom & Jerry, Ben (Colin Jost)Valerian and the City of a Thousand Planets, Major Valerian (Dane DeHaan)

AnimationKim Possible'', Ronald Stoppable

References

External links
  
  
 

1978 births
Living people
21st-century Japanese male actors
American emigrants to Japan
Japanese male video game actors
Japanese male voice actors
Male actors from San Francisco
Male actors from Tokyo